Southbridge is a small town on the Canterbury Plains in the South Island of New Zealand.

The town serves mainly as a centre for agricultural services, but also has nearly 70 small to medium-sized businesses, a swimming pool, tennis courts, Southbridge Primary School, and many other attractions.

On 13 July 1875, a branch line railway was opened from Christchurch to Southbridge.  Despite proposals to extend it further to Longbeach and Waterton, the line's terminus remained in Southbridge and it was thus known as the Southbridge Branch.  Traffic was strong in the line's early decades; in 1914, two mixed trains and a goods-only train ran each way daily.  However, the line entered into decline after the late 1920s.  Passenger services to Southbridge were cancelled on 14 April 1951, and the line closed entirely on 30 June 1962.  Few remnants of the line remain, though locations of level crossings can be discerned.

Ngāti Moki marae, a marae (tribal meeting ground) of Ngāi Tahu and its Te Taumutu Rūnanga branch, is located in Southbridge. It includes Ngāti Moki wharenui (meeting house).

Demographics 
Southbridge is described by Statistics New Zealand as a rural settlement.

The settlement had a population of 906 at the 2018 New Zealand census, an increase of 48 people (5.6%) since the 2013 census, and an increase of 168 people (22.8%) since the 2006 census. There were 327 households. There were 456 males and 453 females, giving a sex ratio of 1.01 males per female, with 201 people (22.2%) aged under 15 years, 141 (15.6%) aged 15 to 29, 429 (47.4%) aged 30 to 64, and 138 (15.2%) aged 65 or older.

Ethnicities were 92.7% European/Pākehā, 8.3% Māori, 1.7% Pacific peoples, 2.0% Asian, and 3.3% other ethnicities (totals add to more than 100% since people could identify with multiple ethnicities).

Although some people objected to giving their religion, 57.0% had no religion, 32.1% were Christian, 0.3% were Buddhist and 2.3% had other religions.

Of those at least 15 years old, 75 (10.6%) people had a bachelor or higher degree, and 162 (23.0%) people had no formal qualifications. The employment status of those at least 15 was that 372 (52.8%) people were employed full-time, 123 (17.4%) were part-time, and 18 (2.6%) were unemployed.

Southbridge statistical area

Southbridge had a population of 2,490 at the 2018 New Zealand census, an increase of 60 people (2.5%) since the 2013 census, and an increase of 327 people (15.1%) since the 2006 census. There were 906 households. There were 1,275 males and 1,218 females, giving a sex ratio of 1.05 males per female. The median age was 39.6 years (compared with 37.4 years nationally), with 540 people (21.7%) aged under 15 years, 429 (17.2%) aged 15 to 29, 1,188 (47.7%) aged 30 to 64, and 333 (13.4%) aged 65 or older.

Ethnicities were 88.2% European/Pākehā, 8.9% Māori, 2.3% Pacific peoples, 5.8% Asian, and 3.6% other ethnicities (totals add to more than 100% since people could identify with multiple ethnicities).

The proportion of people born overseas was 17.5%, compared with 27.1% nationally.

Although some people objected to giving their religion, 52.8% had no religion, 35.8% were Christian, 1.3% were Hindu, 0.2% were Muslim, 0.2% were Buddhist and 2.3% had other religions.

Of those at least 15 years old, 297 (15.2%) people had a bachelor or higher degree, and 405 (20.8%) people had no formal qualifications. The median income was $38,500, compared with $31,800 nationally. The employment status of those at least 15 was that 1,137 (58.3%) people were employed full-time, 309 (15.8%) were part-time, and 36 (1.8%) were unemployed.

Education
Southbridge School is a contributing primary school catering for years 1 to 6.

Southbridge District High School opened in 1903 and shared space with the primary school until a fire in 1924 destroyed the buildings. It was rebuilt on the same site, while the primary school moved across the road. The high school closed in 1981.

Notable people 
Colonel Allen Bell (1870–1936), politician born in Southbridge
Dan Carter (born 1982), rugby union player born Southbridge 
George Howes (1879–1946), entomologist born in Southbridge
Pat McEvedy (1880–1935), rugby union player and administrator born in Southbridge
Francie Turner (born 1992), coxswain who grew up in Southbridge
Mabel Rose Wilson (1883–1962), domestic worker and community leader

References

External links 
Southbridge at the Selwyn District Council

Selwyn District
Populated places in Canterbury, New Zealand